Vladimir Kiriakovitch Triandafillov (14 March 189412 July 1931) was a Soviet military commander and theoretician considered by many to be the "father of Soviet operational art".

Biography
He was born on 14 March 1894 in Magaradzhik village in Kars Oblast, then in the Russian Empire (today in Mağaracık, Turkey) of Pontic Greek parents. The family name derives from triantáfyllo, τριαντάφυλλο, Modern Greek for the rose flower. His family had moved to Russia. Graduating from the Moscow Praporshchik School in 1915, he served in the Russian Army in World War I, earning the rank of captain. During the Russian Civil War, he rose in rank up to brigade commander while fighting on various fronts. He became a member of the Russian Communist Party (b) in 1919.

In 1923, he was appointed chief of the Operations Directions of the Soviet General Staff and Deputy Chief of the General Staff.

Vladimir Triandafillov was the author of two fundamental military doctrine works: Scale of the Operations of Modern Armies, published in 1926 and Characteristics of the Operations of the Modern Armies, published in 1929. In these two works, he elaborated his deep operations theory about the future warfare. The objective of a "deep operation" was to attack the enemy simultaneously throughout the depth of his ground force to induce a catastrophic failure in his defensive system. Highly mobile formations would then exploit this failure by breaking into the deep rear of the enemy and destroying his ability to rebuild his defenses. 

Vladimir Triandafillov was killed in an aircraft crash on 12 July, 1931 and his ashes were buried in the Kremlin Wall Necropolis. The quality of his work was realised late during World War II, when Georgy Zhukov said that his success was due to closely following Triandafillov's deep operations doctrine.

References

Further reading
 K.A. Zalessky, Stalin's Empire (biographic dictionary), Moscow, Veche, 2000.
 Great Soviet Encyclopedia, Moscow, 1969—1978.
 Triandafillov, Vladimir, Kipp, Jacob W., (trans.), The Nature of the Operations of Modern Armies (Cass Series on the Soviet Study of War, 5), Routledge, 1st edition, 1994.

1894 births
1931 deaths
People from Kars
People from Kars Oblast
Pontic Greeks
Russian people of Greek descent
Soviet people of Greek descent
Bolsheviks
Soviet generals
Military theorists
Russian military writers
Imperial Russian Army officers
Russian military personnel of World War I
Soviet military personnel of the Russian Civil War
Recipients of the Order of the Red Banner
Victims of aviation accidents or incidents in the Soviet Union
Burials at the Kremlin Wall Necropolis